The 3rd Golden Eagle Awards were held April 3, 1985, in Hangzhou, Zhejiang province.  Nominees and winners are listed below, winners are in bold.

Best Television Series
not awarded this year
Huo Yuanjia/霍元甲
Harbin Under The Curtain/夜幕下的哈尔滨
Blizzard Tonight/今夜有暴风雪

Best Mini-series
not awarded this year
Captain and His Wife/远洋船长和他的妻子
Blue House/蓝屋
Chen Yi and Assassin/陈毅与刺客
Hua Sheng A Gou/花生阿狗

Best Lead Actor in a Television Series
Ren Zhiyu for Xu Beihong

Best Lead Actress in a Television Series
Ren Meng for Blizzard Tonight

Best Supporting Actor in a Television Series
Lv Yi for Blizzard Tonight

Best Supporting Actress in a Television Series
Hong Xuemin for Soldier

Best Dubbing Actor
Jian Zhaoqiang for The Blood Doubts

Best Dubbing Actress
Yao Xijuan for The Blood Doubts

Best Foreign Actor
Yamazaki Tsutomu for The Blood Doubts

Best Foreign Actress
Lucélia Santos for Escrava Isaura

References

1985
1985 in Chinese television
Mass media in Hangzhou